Mark A. Hardy is Auchincloss Professor of Surgery, Director Emeritus of the Transplant Centre, and Vice Chairman and Residency Program Director of the Department of Surgery at the Columbia University College of Physicians and Surgeons and NewYork-Presbyterian Hospital in New York City.

Hardy is most recognized for co-founding the New York Organ Donor Network in 1978 (NYODN 2006). In addition to his work in transplantation, in the earlier part of his career he made several contributions to the development of prosthetic vascular grafts and the development and studies of biologic function of thymic hormones, both experimentally and clinically.

Hardy laid another cornerstone of organ transplant medicine by helping found the program for dialysis and kidney transplantation at NewYork-Presbyterian Hospital. He based the new program on the principle of combined clinical care between surgeons and nephrologists during a time when renal transplant programs were managed by one or the other discipline, never by both at once (CUMC Programs 2007). This cooperation between disciplines led to major contributions in immunogenetics, immunosuppression, and treatment of autoimmune diseases and lymphoma (CUMC Programs 2007).

His most recent focus has been on cellular transplantation with emphasis on islet transplantation. Hardy is Principal Investigator of a multicenter clinical trial exploring a combination of two immunosuppressant drugs, sirolimus and tacrolimus (CUMC 2007 Kidney). He also currently a member of several multiinstitutional studies of immunosuppressive agents which are individually sponsored by Novartis, Astellas and Bristol Myers.

Honors
Hardy has been a professor in about 30 institutions and delivered over 10 eponymous lectures worldwide. He has received honoraria for lectures in the past from Upjohn, Sangstat, Hoffmann-La Roche, Novartis, Astellas, and Gore.

 Honorary Doctor of Philosophy, Hallym University, South Korea, 2004
 Honoris Causa Doctoris, University of Warsaw, 2000
 Honorary Fellowship in the Polish Surgical Society, 1999
 NIH Academic Scholar in Surgery, 1968–1971

Selected publications
Hardy is an editor of Transplantation and has published more than 300 articles on subjects varying from surgical techniques to basic immunology. He was also editor of one of the first books on xenotransplantation, Xenograft 25.

 Loss, Grief & Care. M.A. Hardy, J. Kiernan, A.H. Kutscher, L. Cahill and A. Benvenisty (eds.). The Haworth Press, Inc., New York. 1991.
 Xenograft 25. M.A. Hardy (ed.). Elsevier Science Publishers B.V., Amsterdam. 1989.
  Transplantation of the Endocrine Pancreas in Diabetes Mellitus. R. van Schilfgaarde, M.A. Hardy (eds.). Elsevier Science Publishers B.V., Amsterdam. 1988.
 Evaluation of a°. A 360 Night-float System for General Surgery: A Response to Mandated Work-hours Reduction. MJ Goldstein, E Kim, WD Widmann, MA Hardy. Current Surgery. 61(5):445-451. 2004.
 The Use of Allopeptides in Tolerance Induction In Rodents. MA Hardy, OO Oluwole, HA Depaz, R Gopinathan, AO Ali, M Garrovillo and SF Oluwole. Graft. 2003.

External links
 Dr. Mark A. Hardy at Columbia University Department of Surgery

References
 New York Organ Donor Network
 https://web.archive.org/web/20070926221857/http://www.columbiasurgery.org/res/immunology/bio_hardy.html
 https://web.archive.org/web/20070630185947/http://www.columbiasurgery.org/programs/tx/history.html
 http://www.columbiasurgery.org/pat/kidneypancreastx/maximize.html

American transplant surgeons
Medical educators
Columbia University faculty
Living people
Year of birth missing (living people)